Pencoyd Bridge could refer to:
 Pencoyd Railroad Bridge in Kansas City
 Pencoyd Bridge (Pennsylvania) in Philadelphia and Bala Cynwyd, Pennsylvania
 Manayunk Bridge in Pennsylvania, also called “Pencoyd Viaduct”